Popetown is a French-British adult animated sitcom, billed by its producers as "Father Ted meets South Park". The series was internationally controversial, and was not screened by BBC Three, the channel which commissioned it.

Outline
The series follows the doodles and scribblings of a student at school during a lesson. His drawings depict the life of Father Nicholas, who lives in a Vatican City parody referred to as "Popetown". He is charged with being the handler for the Pope (who is always referred to by his title, and never given any name) who is a complete nincompoop with the emotional and mental maturity of a four-year-old. Father Nicholas must keep the Pope out of trouble, and make sure the general public does not find out that the Holy Father is a drooling idiot. Other characters include a priest who is a sexual deviant, an extremely buxom and vain nun who serves as the Popetown news anchor and a trio of corrupt cardinals who secretly run Popetown and attempt to get rich behind the Pope's back. These and other elements caused the show to be extremely controversial.

The original English-language version of the show features the voices of actor and Popetown writer Mackenzie Crook, Little Britain co-creator Matt Lucas, providing the voice for one of the cardinals, and actress Jerry Hall. Ruby Wax is the voice actor for The Pope.

The series was originally commissioned by BBC Three in the United Kingdom, but was dropped from scheduling without a screening in the wake of protests from Roman Catholics. The premiere screened on New Zealand's C4 television network on 8 June 2005. Despite never being shown on British television, it was eventually released on DVD in the UK by Revolver Entertainment on 5 September 2005, in Australia by Roadshow Entertainment and in Germany, where it was aired on television, by Polyband. It was also currently aired on several MTV channels, including MTV Latin America, MTV Latvia, MTV Estonia and others. The show was also banned in some countries (for example, Lithuania).

Cast
Bob Mortimer as Father Nicholas
Ruby Wax as The Pope
Morwenna Banks as Sister Marie
Jerry Hall as Sister Penelope
Matt Lucas as Cardinal One
Kevin Eldon as Cardinal Two
Simon Greenall as Cardinal Three
Ben Miller as Priest

Crew
The show was written by a team of seven writers:
Kevin Eldon
James Bachman
Mackenzie Crook
Isabelle Dubernet
Mark Evans
Eric Fuhrer
Phil Ox
David Quantick

Phil Ox also served as director and producer for the series.

The series was also produced by:
Heather Hampson
Stacy Herbert
Alan Marke
Yohanne Seroussi
Rebecca Ferrand

Episodes

Controversies

New Zealand
The Catholic Church in New Zealand had been considering laying a complaint to the Broadcasting Standards Authority . Bishops called for a boycott of all CanWest television and radio stations. C4 had received many complaints about the show but refused to pull it from its lineup.

Germany 
In Germany, where insulting religious groups is a crime, MTV broadcast the first episode on 3 May 2006. After an advertisement was published at the start of the Holy Week featuring Jesus in a chair watching TV (with the heading "laugh instead of hanging around"), both MTV and the series drew sharp criticism from some Christians in Germany; the office of the archbishop of Munich said it is investigating an injunction to block the series. Popetown became a topic of public debate, even though few have had the opportunity to see the show.

Several Christian denominations, along with conservative politicians and the Jewish and Muslim communities demanded that MTV withdraw the series. An Evangelical magazine has put up an anti-Popetown website, stoppt-popetown.de. The Archbishop of Munich and the parliamentary leader of the conservative CSU party in Bavaria demanded criminal prosecution of those responsible for the series under § 166 of the Penal Code, the "blasphemy clause". Edmund Stoiber, leader of the CSU, also demanded more severe punishments for slander of religious feelings.

Nondenominational organizations like the IBKA and others argued that satire must be allowed and censorship must not take place. Supporters of the series brought forward the argument that Popetown cannot be forbidden, just as the Muhammad cartoons are allowed for reasons of press freedom.

After a discussion on MTV, which ended up with some 87% of online voters supporting broadcast, MTV decided to broadcast all of the other episodes. The experts taking position in the show said they would not broadcast it, but also not forbid it.

United States
The series has yet to be broadcast or released on DVD in the United States, but it has spread by word of mouth, YouTube, and file sharing networks. In the 20 April 2006 edition of his weekly column, Parents Television and Media Council founder L. Brent Bozell wrote an article criticizing Viacom for airing this anti-Christian series on MTV Germany as well as allowing a scene defacing Jesus Christ in the episode of the American animated series South Park, "Cartoon Wars Part II". In America, South Park is broadcast on the Viacom network Comedy Central.

Lithuania
In March 2007, the MTV Baltics network was fined 3,000 litas (896 EUR) by the Lithuanian broadcasting regulator for airing the animation. In response, MTV series director Marius Veselis accused Lithuania of unmasking itself as a "sort of half-medieval, half-communist, sick culture".

See also
List of television series cancelled before airing an episode

References

External links

2005 French television series debuts
2015 French television series endings
2005 British television series debuts
2005 British television series endings
2000s British animated comedy television series
2000s British adult animated television series
French adult animated comedy television series
British adult animated comedy television series
BBC television comedy
Fictional popes
Catholicism in fiction
Television series about Christian religious leaders
Religious controversies in animation
BBC controversies
Christianity in popular culture controversies
Animation controversies in television
Television controversies in the United Kingdom
Religious controversies in television
Religious controversies in the United Kingdom